Robert Steven "Bob" Balog (November 2, 1924 in Youngstown, Ohio – May 3, 2011) was a professional American football offensive lineman and linebacker in the National Football League.

He played college football at the University of Denver

References

Players of American football from Youngstown, Ohio
American football centers
American football linebackers
Pittsburgh Steelers players
Georgia Bulldogs football players
Denver Pioneers football players
1924 births
2011 deaths